The 18th United States Congress was a meeting of the legislative branch of the United States federal government, consisting of the United States Senate and the United States House of Representatives. It met in Washington, D.C. from March 4, 1823, to March 4, 1825, during the seventh and eighth years of James Monroe's presidency. The apportionment of seats in the House of Representatives was based on the 1820 United States census. Both chambers had a Democratic-Republican majority.

Major events

 August 1823: Arikara War fought between the Arikara nation and the United States, the first American military conflict with the Plains Indians.
 December 2, 1823: Monroe Doctrine: President James Monroe delivered a speech to the Congress, announcing a new policy of forbidding European interference in the Americas and establishing American neutrality in future European conflicts.
 February 9, 1825: John Quincy Adams elected as President of the United States by the House of Representatives in accordance with the contingent election provision of the Twelfth Amendment, as no candidate had received a majority of the electoral votes cast in the 1824 presidential election. The House was required to choose between Adams, Andrew Jackson, and William Crawford (the top three presidential electoral-vote recipients), with the delegation from each of the 24 states having one vote. Adams was elected on the first ballot by 13 to 7 to 4.

{| class="wikitable"
!  | States for Adams
!  | States for Jackson
!  | States for Crawford
|-style="vertical-align:top"
|
 Connecticut
 Illinois
 Kentucky
 Louisiana
 Maine
 Maryland
 Massachusetts
 Missouri
 New Hampshire
 New York
 Ohio
 Rhode Island
 Vermont
|
 Alabama
 Indiana
 Mississippi
 New Jersey
 Pennsylvania
 South Carolina
 Tennessee
|
 Delaware
 Georgia
 North Carolina
 Virginia
|-
| |Total: 13 (54%)
| |Total: 7 (29%)
| |Total: 4 (17%)
|}

Major legislation

 January 7, 1824: Tariff of 1824, Sess. 1, ch. 4, 
 March 3, 1825: Crimes Act of 1825, Sess. 2, ch. 65,

Party summary
The count below identifies party affiliations at the beginning of the first session of this Congress, and includes members from vacancies and newly admitted states, when they were first seated. Changes resulting from subsequent replacements are shown below in the "Changes in membership" section.

Senate

House of Representatives

Leadership

Senate
 President: Daniel D. Tompkins (DR)
 President pro tempore: John Gaillard (DR)

House of Representatives 
 Speaker: Henry Clay (DR)

Members
This list is arranged by chamber, then by state. Senators are listed by class, and representatives are listed by district.
Skip to House of Representatives, below

Senate
Senators were elected by the state legislatures every two years, with one-third beginning new six-year terms with each Congress. Preceding the names in the list below are Senate class numbers, which indicate the cycle of their election. In this Congress, Class 1 meant their term began in the last Congress, requiring re-election in 1826; Class 2 meant their term began with this Congress, requiring re-election in 1828; and Class 3 meant their term ended with this Congress, requiring re-election in 1824.

Alabama 
 2. William R. King (DR)
 3. William Kelly (DR)

Connecticut 
 1. Elijah Boardman (DR), until August 18, 1823
 Henry W. Edwards (DR), from October 8, 1823
 3. James Lanman (DR)

Delaware 
 1. Thomas Clayton (F), from January 8, 1824
 2. Nicholas Van Dyke (F), from January 7, 1824

Georgia 
 2. Nicholas Ware (DR), until September 7, 1824
 Thomas W. Cobb (DR), from December 6, 1824
 3. John Elliott (DR)

Illinois 
 2. Jesse B. Thomas (DR)
 3. Ninian Edwards (DR), until March 4, 1824
 John McLean (DR), from November 23, 1824

Indiana 
 1. James Noble (DR)
 3. Waller Taylor (DR)

Kentucky 
 2. Richard M. Johnson (DR)
 3. Isham Talbot (DR)

Louisiana 
 2. Henry Johnson (DR), until May 27, 1824
 Dominique J. Bouligny (DR), from November 19, 1824
 3. James Brown (DR), until December 10, 1823
 Josiah S. Johnston (DR), from January 15, 1824

Maine 
 1. John Holmes (DR)
 2. John Chandler (DR)

Maryland 
 1. Samuel Smith (DR)
 3. Edward Lloyd (DR)

Massachusetts 
 1. Elijah H. Mills (F)
 2. James Lloyd (F)

Mississippi 
 1. David Holmes (DR)
 2. Thomas H. Williams (DR)

Missouri 
 1. Thomas H. Benton (DR)
 3. David Barton (DR)

New Hampshire 
 2. Samuel Bell (DR)
 3. John F. Parrott (DR)

New Jersey 
 1. Joseph McIlvaine (DR), from November 12, 1823
 2. Mahlon Dickerson (DR)

New York 
 1. Martin Van Buren (DR)
 3. Rufus King (F)

North Carolina 
 2. John Branch (DR)
 3. Nathaniel Macon (DR)

Ohio 
 1. Benjamin Ruggles (DR)
 3. Ethan Allen Brown (DR)

Pennsylvania 
 1. William Findlay (DR)
 3. Walter Lowrie (DR)

Rhode Island 
 1. James De Wolf (DR)
 2. Nehemiah R. Knight (DR)

South Carolina 
 2. Robert Y. Hayne (DR)
 3. John Gaillard (DR)

Tennessee 
 1. John H. Eaton (DR)
 2. Andrew Jackson (DR)

Vermont 
 1. Horatio Seymour (DR)
 3. William A. Palmer (DR)

Virginia 
 1. James Barbour (DR)
 2. John Taylor (DR), until August 21, 1824
 Littleton W. Tazewell (DR), from December 7, 1824

House of Representatives 
The names of members of the House of Representatives are preceded by their district numbers.

Alabama
 . Gabriel Moore (DR-J)
 . John McKee (DR-J)
 . George W. Owen (DR-J)

Connecticut 
All representatives were elected statewide on a general ticket.
 . Noyes Barber (DR-A)
 . Samuel A. Foot (DR-A)
 . Ansel Sterling (DR-A)
 . Ebenezer Stoddard (DR-A)
 . Gideon Tomlinson (DR-A)
 . Lemuel Whitman (DR-A)

Delaware 
 . Louis McLane (F-C)

Georgia 
All representatives were elected statewide on a general ticket.
 . Joel Abbot (DR-C)
 . George Cary (DR-C)
 . Thomas W. Cobb (DR-C), until December 6, 1824
 Richard Henry Wilde (DR-C), from February 7, 1825
 . Alfred Cuthbert (DR-C)
 . John Forsyth (DR-C)
 . Edward F. Tattnall (DR-C)
 . Wiley Thompson (DR-C)

Illinois 
 . Daniel P. Cook (DR-A)

Indiana 
 . William Prince (DR-J), until September 8, 1824
 Jacob Call (DR-J), from December 23, 1824
 . Jonathan Jennings (DR-J)
 . John Test (DR-J)

Kentucky 
 . David Trimble (DR-A)
 . Thomas Metcalfe (DR-A)
 . Henry Clay (DR-A)
 . Robert P. Letcher (DR-A)
 . John T. Johnson (DR-J)
 . David White (DR-A)
 . Thomas P. Moore (DR-J)
 . Richard A. Buckner (DR-A)
 . Charles A. Wickliffe (DR-J)
 . Francis Johnson (DR-A)
 . Philip Thompson (DR-A)
 . Robert P. Henry (DR-J)

Louisiana 
 . Edward Livingston (DR-J)
 . Henry H. Gurley (DR-A)
 . William L. Brent (DR-A)

Maine 
 . William Burleigh (DR-A)
 . Stephen Longfellow (F-A)
 . Ebenezer Herrick (DR-A)
 . Joshua Cushman (DR-A)
 . Enoch Lincoln (DR-A)
 . Jeremiah O'Brien (DR-A)
 . David Kidder (DR-A)

Maryland 
The 5th district was a plural district with two representatives.
 . Raphael Neale (F-A)
 . Joseph Kent (DR-A)
 . Henry R. Warfield (F-A)
 . John Lee (F-J)
 . Peter Little (DR-J)
 . Isaac McKim (DR-J)
 . George E. Mitchell (DR-A)
 . William Hayward Jr. (DR-C)
 . John S. Spence (DR-A)

Massachusetts 
 . Daniel Webster (F-A)
 . Benjamin W. Crowninshield (DR-A)
 . Jeremiah Nelson (F-A)
 . Timothy Fuller (DR-A)
 . Jonas Sibley (DR-A)
 . John Locke (DR-A)
 . Samuel C. Allen (F-A)
 . Samuel Lathrop (F-A)
 . Henry W. Dwight (F-A)
 . John Bailey (DR-A), from December 13, 1824
 . Aaron Hobart (DR-A)
 . Francis Baylies (F-J)
 . John Reed Jr. (F-A)

Mississippi 
 . Christopher Rankin (DR-J)

Missouri 
 . John Scott (DR-A)

New Hampshire 
All representatives were elected statewide on a general ticket.
 . Ichabod Bartlett (DR-A)
 . Matthew Harvey (DR-A)
 . Arthur Livermore (DR-A)
 . Aaron Matson (DR-A)
 . William Plumer Jr. (DR-A)
 . Thomas Whipple Jr. (DR-A)

New Jersey 
All representatives were elected statewide on a general ticket.

 . George Cassedy (DR-J)
 . Lewis Condict (DR-J)
 . Daniel Garrison (DR-J)
 . George Holcombe (DR-J)
 . James Matlack (DR-A)
 . Samuel Swan (DR-J)

New York 
There were three plural districts: the 20th & 26th had two representatives each, the 3rd had three representatives.
 . Silas Wood (DR-A)
 . Jacob Tyson (DR-C)
 . Churchill C. Cambreleng (DR-C)
 . John J. Morgan (DR-J)
 . Peter Sharpe (DR-A)
 . Joel Frost (DR-C)
 . William W. Van Wyck (DR-A)
 . Hector Craig (DR-J)
 . Lemuel Jenkins (DR-C)
 . James Strong (F-A)
 . James L. Hogeboom (DR-C)
 . Stephen Van Rensselaer (F-A)
 . Charles A. Foote (DR-C)
 . Lewis Eaton (DR-C)
 . Isaac Williams Jr. (DR-A)
 . Henry R. Storrs (F-A)
 . John Herkimer (DR-A)
 . John W. Cady (DR-A)
 . John W. Taylor (DR-A)
 . Henry C. Martindale (F-A)
 . John Richards (DR-C)
 . Ela Collins (DR-C)
 . Egbert Ten Eyck (DR-C)
 . Lot Clark (DR-C)
 . Justin Dwinell (DR-C)
 . Elisha Litchfield (DR-C)
 . Rowland Day (DR-C)
 . Samuel Lawrence (DR-A)
 . Dudley Marvin (DR-A)
 . Robert S. Rose (DR-A)
 . Moses Hayden (DR-A)
 . William B. Rochester (DR-A), until April 23, 1823
 William Woods (DR-A), from November 3, 1823
 . Isaac Wilson (DR-A), until January 7, 1824
 Parmenio Adams (DR-A), from January 7, 1824
 . Albert H. Tracy (DR-A)

North Carolina 
 . Alfred M. Gatlin (DR-C)
 . Hutchins G. Burton (DR-C), until March 23, 1824
 George Outlaw (DR-C), from January 19, 1825
 . Thomas H. Hall (DR-C)
 . Richard D. Spaight Jr. (DR-C)
 . Charles Hooks (DR-C)
 . Weldon N. Edwards (DR-C)
 . John Culpepper (F-A)
 . Willie P. Mangum (DR-C)
 . Romulus M. Saunders (DR-C)
 . John Long (DR-C)
 . Henry W. Connor (DR-J)
 . Robert B. Vance (DR-J)
 . Lewis Williams (DR-C)

Ohio 
 . James W. Gazlay (DR-J)
 . Thomas R. Ross (DR-C)
 . William McLean (DR-A)
 . Joseph Vance (DR-A)
 . John W. Campbell (DR-J)
 . Duncan McArthur (DR-A)
 . Samuel F. Vinton (DR-A)
 . William Wilson (DR-C)
 . Philemon Beecher (DR-A)
 . John Patterson (DR-A)
 . John C. Wright (DR-A)
 . John Sloane (DR-A)
 . Elisha Whittlesey (DR-A)
 . Mordecai Bartley (DR-A)

Pennsylvania 
There were six plural districts: the 7th, 8th, 11th, and 16th had two representatives each, the 4th and 9th had three representatives each.
 . Samuel Breck (F-A)
 . Joseph Hemphill (F-J)
 . Daniel H. Miller (DR-J)
 . James Buchanan (F-J)
 . Samuel Edwards (F-J)
 . Isaac Wayne (F-J)
 . Philip S. Markley (DR-J)
 . Robert Harris (DR-J)
 . Daniel Udree (DR-J)
 . Henry Wilson (DR-J)
 . Samuel D. Ingham (DR-J)
 . Thomas J. Rogers (DR-J), until April 20, 1824
 George Wolf (DR-J), from December 9, 1824
 . William Cox Ellis (F-J)
 . George Kremer (DR-J)
 . Samuel McKean (DR-J)
 . James S. Mitchell (DR-J)
 . John Findlay (DR-J)
 . James Wilson (DR-J)
 . John Brown (DR-J)
 . John Tod (DR-J), until ????, 1824
 Alexander Thomson (DR-J), from December 6, 1824
 . Andrew Stewart (DR-J)
 . Thomas Patterson (DR-J)
 . James Allison Jr. (DR-J)
 . Walter Forward (DR-J)
 . George Plumer (DR-J)
 . Patrick Farrelly (DR-J)

Rhode Island 
All representatives were elected statewide on a general ticket.

 . Job Durfee (DR-A)
 . Samuel Eddy (DR-A)

South Carolina 
 . Joel R. Poinsett (DR-J)
 . James Hamilton Jr. (DR-J)
 . Robert B. Campbell (DR-J)
 . Andrew R. Govan (DR-J)
 . George McDuffie (DR-J)
 . John Wilson (DR-J)
 . Joseph Gist (DR-J)
 . John Carter (DR-J)
 . Starling Tucker (DR-J)

Tennessee 
 . John Blair (DR-J)
 . John Cocke (DR-J)
 . James I. Standifer (DR-J)
 . Jacob C. Isacks (DR-J)
 . Robert Allen (DR-J)
 . James T. Sandford (DR-J)
 . Samuel Houston (DR-J)
 . James B. Reynolds (DR-J)
 . Adam R. Alexander (DR-J)

Vermont 
All representatives were elected statewide on a general ticket.
 . Rollin C. Mallary (DR-A)
 . William C. Bradley (DR-A)
 . Charles Rich (DR-A), until October 15, 1824
 Henry Olin (DR-A), from December 13, 1824
 . Daniel A. A. Buck (DR-A)
 . Samuel C. Crafts (DR-A)

Virginia 
 . Thomas Newton Jr. (DR-A)
 . Arthur Smith (DR-C)
 . William S. Archer (DR-C)
 . Mark Alexander (DR-C)
 . John Randolph (DR-C)
 . George Tucker (DR-C)
 . Jabez Leftwich (DR-C)
 . Burwell Bassett (DR-C)
 . Andrew Stevenson (DR-C)
 . William C. Rives (DR-C)
 . Philip P. Barbour (DR-C)
 . Robert S. Garnett (DR-C)
 . William Lee Ball (DR-C), until February 29, 1824
 John Taliaferro (DR-C), from March 24, 1824
 . Charles F. Mercer (DR-C)
 . John S. Barbour (DR-C)
 . James Stephenson (F-C)
 . Jared Williams (DR-C)
 . Joseph Johnson (DR-J)
 . William McCoy (DR-C)
 . John Floyd (DR-C)
 . William Smith (DR-C)
 . Alexander Smyth (DR-C)

Non-voting members 
 . Henry W. Conway
 . Richard K. Call
 . Gabriel Richard

Changes in membership
The count below reflects changes from the beginning of the first session of this Congress.

Senate 
 Deaths: 3
 Resignations: 3
 Vacancy: 2
Total seats with changes: 8

|-
| New Jersey(1)
| Vacant
| Samuel L. Southard resigned at end of previous Congress.Successor elected November 12, 1823.
|  | Joseph McIlvaine (DR)
| November 12, 1823

|-
| Delaware(2)
| Vacant
| Legislature had failed to elect.Incumbent was re-elected late January 7, 1824.
|  | Nicholas Van Dyke (F)
| January 7, 1824

|-
| Delaware(1)
| Vacant
| Caesar A. Rodney resigned in previous term.Successor elected January 8, 1824.
|  | Thomas Clayton (F)
| January 8, 1824

|-
| Connecticut(1)
|  | Elijah Boardman (DR)
| Died August 18, 1823.Successor appointed October 8, 1823, and later elected May 5, 1824.
|  | Henry W. Edwards (DR)
| October 8, 1823

|-
| Louisiana(3)
|  | James Brown (DR)
| Resigned December 10, 1823, after being appointed Minister to France.Successor appointed January 15, 1824.
|  | Josiah S. Johnston (DR)
| January 15, 1824

|-
| Illinois(3)
|  | Ninian Edwards (DR)
| Resigned March 4, 1824, after being appointed Minister to Mexico.Successor elected November, 1824.
|  | John McLean (DR)
| November 23, 1824

|-
| Louisiana(2)
|  | Henry Johnson (DR)
| Resigned May 27, 1824, to run for Governor of Louisiana.Successor elected November 19, 1824.
|  | Dominique J. Bouligny (DR)
| November 19, 1824

|-
| Virginia(2)
|  | John Taylor (DR)
| Died August 21, 1824.Successor elected December 7, 1824.
|  | Littleton W. Tazewell (DR)
| December 7, 1824

|-
| Georgia(2)
|  | Nicholas Ware (DR)
| Died September 7, 1824.Successor elected December 6, 1824.
|  | Thomas W. Cobb (DR)
| December 6, 1824

|}

House of Representatives 
 Deaths: 3
 Resignations: 5
 Contested election: 2
Total seats with changes: 10

|-
| 
| Vacant
| John Bailey was declared not entitled to seat in previous election.Bailey was then re-elected.
|  | John Bailey (A-DR)
| Seated December 13, 1824.

|-
| 
|  | William B. Rochester (A-DR)
| Resigned April 21, 1823.New member elected.
|  | William Woods (A-DR)
| Seated November 3, 1823.

|-
| 
|  | John Tod (J-DR)
| Resigned sometime in 1824.New member elected.
|  | Alexander Thomson (J-DR)
| Seated December 6, 1824.

|-
| 
|  | Isaac Wilson (A-DR)
| Lost contested election January 7, 1824.New member seated.
|  | Parmenio Adams (A-DR)
| Seated January 7, 1824.

|-
| 
|  | William Lee Ball (C-DR)
| Died February 29, 1824.New member elected.
|  | John Taliaferro (C-DR)
| Seated March 24, 1824.

|-
| 
|  | Hutchins G. Burton (C-DR)
| Resigned March 23, 1824 when elected Governor of North Carolina.New member elected.
|  | George Outlaw (C-DR)
| Seated January 19, 1825.

|-
| 
|  | Thomas J. Rogers (J-DR)
| Resigned April 20, 1824.New member elected.
|  | George Wolf (J-DR)
| Seated December 9, 1824.

|-
| 
|  | William Prince (J-DR)
| Died September 8, 1824.New member elected.
|  | Jacob Call (J-DR)
| Seated December 23, 1824.

|-
| 
|  | Charles Rich (A-DR)
| Died October 15, 1824.New member elected.
|  | Henry Olin (A-DR)
| Seated December 13, 1824.

|-
| 
|  | Thomas W. Cobb (C-DR)
| Resigned December 6, 1824 when elected U.S. Senator.New member elected.
|  | Richard H. Wilde (C-DR)
| Seated February 7, 1825.

|}

Committees
Lists of committees and their party leaders.

Senate

 Amendments to the Constitution (Select)
 Audit and Control the Contingent Expenses of the Senate (Chairman: Horatio Seymour)
 Banks in Which Deposits Have Been Made (Select)
 Claims (Chairman: Benjamin Ruggles)
 Commerce and Manufactures (Chairman: Mahlon Dickerson)
 Debt Imprisonment Abolition (Select)
 District of Columbia (Chairman: Edward Lloyd)
 Engrossed Bills (Chairman: James Lanman)
 Finance (Chairman: Samuel Smith)
 Foreign Relations (Chairman: James Barbour)
 Indian Affairs (Chairman: Thomas Hart Benton)
 Judiciary (Chairman: Martin Van Buren)
 Marquis de La Fayette (Select)
 Memorial of the Legislature of Arkansas (Select)
 Military Affairs (Chairman: Andrew Jackson)
 Militia (Chairman: John Chandler)
 National Road from Cumberland to Wheeling (Select)
 Naval Affairs (Chairman: James Lloyd)
 Peale's Portrait of Washington (Select)
 Pensions (Chairman: James Noble)
 Post Office and Post Roads (Chairman: James Lanman)
 Public Lands (Chairman: David Barton)
 Roads and Canals (Select) (Chairman: James Brown then Ethan Allen Brown)
 Tariff Regulation (Select)
 Whole

House of Representatives

 Accounts (Chairman: Samuel C. Allen)
 Agriculture (Chairman: Stephen Van Rensselaer)
 Arms Contracts (Select)
 Banking Memorials (Select)
 Claims (Chairman: Lewis Williams)
 Commerce (Chairman: Thomas Newton Jr.)
 District of Columbia (Chairman: Joseph Kent)
 Elections (Chairman: John Sloane)
 Expenditures in the Navy Department (Chairman: Samuel Edwards)
 Expenditures in the Post Office Department (Chairman: William Van Wyck)
 Expenditures in the State Department (Chairman: Silas Wood)
 Expenditures in the Treasury Department (Chairman: Weldon N. Edwards)
 Expenditures in the War Department 
 Expenditures on Public Buildings (Chairman: Jeremiah Nelson)
 Foreign Affairs (Chairman: John Forsyth)
 Indian Affairs (Chairman: John Cocke)
 Judiciary (Chairman: Daniel Webster)
 Manufactures (Chairman: John Tod then Walter Forward)
 Military Affairs (Chairman: James Hamilton Jr.)
 Naval Affairs (Chairman: Benjamin W. Crowninshield)
 Pensions and Revolutionary War Claims (Chairman: Peter Little)
 Post Office and Post Roads (Chairman: John T. Johnson)
 Public Expenditures (Chairman: Thomas W. Cobb then Duncan McArthur)
 Public Lands (Chairman: Christopher Rankin)
 Revisal and Unfinished Business (Chairman: Thomas C. Ross then Samuel Lathrop)
 Standards of Official Conduct
 Ways and Means (Chairman: Louis McLane)
 Whole

Joint committees

 Enrolled Bills
 The Library

Employees

Legislative branch agency directors 
 Architect of the Capitol: Charles Bulfinch
 Librarian of Congress: George Watterston

Senate 
 Chaplain: Charles P. McIlvaine (Episcopalian), until December 10, 1823
 William Staughton (Baptist), elected December 10, 1823
 Charles P. McIlvaine (Episcopalian), elected December 14, 1824
 Secretary: Charles Cutts
 Sergeant at Arms: Mountjoy Bayly

House of Representatives 
 Chaplain: John Brackenridge (Presbyterian), until December 8, 1823
 Henry B. Bascom (Methodist), elected December 8, 1823
 Reuben Post (Presbyterian), elected December 9, 1824
 Clerk: Matthew St. Clair Clarke
 Doorkeeper: Benjamin Birch
 Reading Clerks: 
 Sergeant at Arms: Thomas Dunn, elected December 1, 1823, died
 John O. Dunn, elected December 6, 1824

See also 
 1822 United States elections (elections leading to this Congress)
 1822–23 United States Senate elections
 1822–23 United States House of Representatives elections
 1824 United States elections (elections during this Congress, leading to the next Congress)
 1824 United States presidential election
 1824–25 United States Senate elections
 1824–25 United States House of Representatives elections

Notes

References
Notes

Bibliography

External links
Statutes at Large, 1789-1875
Senate Journal, First Forty-three Sessions of Congress
House Journal, First Forty-three Sessions of Congress
Biographical Directory of the U.S. Congress
U.S. House of Representatives: House History
U.S. Senate: Statistics and Lists